( (or , from  + , meaning "honey") is a Greek mixed alcoholic drink. It is a digestive spirit, traditionally used by many Greeks as a home remedy for a sore throat or cough.

Types
 is made by combining  or  - two types of grape pomace brandy - with honey and several spices, such as cinnamon, cardamom, or other regional herbs. It is produced in Crete and other islands of the Aegean Sea and on the Greek mainland, chiefly consumed during the winter as a warm drink. Rakomelo can be found as a bottled mixed drink in liquor stores, ready to be served.

Baked  is also available mixed and bottled, ready for consumption (served at room temperature).

Composition

Notes

Greek cuisine
Mixed drinks
Distilled drinks
Cretan cuisine